Salisbury Plain is a suburb located in the City of Salisbury, Adelaide, South Australia. It lies near the much larger suburbs of Salisbury, Salisbury East and Salisbury Downs.

References